Calizzano ( or ) is a comune (municipality) in the Province of Savona in the Italian region Liguria, located about  southwest of Genoa and about  west of Savona.

Calizzano borders the following municipalities: Bagnasco, Bardineto, Bormida, Garessio, Magliolo, Massimino, Murialdo, Osiglia, Priola, and Rialto. It is in the upper Bormida Valley.

See also 
 Monte Spinarda

References

Cities and towns in Liguria